Robert Treat Academy Charter School is a charter school that serves students in kindergarten through eighth grade in Newark, in Essex County, New Jersey, United States. One of the initial group of 17 charter schools approved in January 1997, the school opened in September 1997 as the state's first charter school.

As of the 2017–18 school year, the district, comprising one school, had an enrollment of 681 students and 43.2 classroom teachers (on an FTE basis), for a student–teacher ratio of 15.8:1.

The sixth grade at Robert Treat Academy was one of 34 schools identified for further investigation by the New Jersey Department of Education after a pattern was identified in which larger than expected numbers of incorrect answers were erased and changed to the correct answer.

Awards and recognition
During the 2008–09 school year, Robert Treat Academy Charter School was recognized with the Blue Ribbon School Award of Excellence by the United States Department of Education, and one of nine schools in the state to be selected for the school year, the highest award an American school can receive from the U.S. Education Department.

Spending

References

External links
School website

Robert Treat Academy Charter School, National Center for Education Statistics

Charter schools in New Jersey
Education in Newark, New Jersey
Charter K–8 schools in the United States
Public K–8 schools in New Jersey
Schools in Essex County, New Jersey